Nusmir Fajić (born 12 January 1987) is a Bosnian professional footballer who plays as a centre-forward for Bjelovar.

Honours
Maribor 
Slovenian PrvaLiga: 2012–13, 2013–14
Slovenian Cup: 2012–13
Slovenian Supercup: 2013, 2014

Velež Mostar
First League of FBiH: 2018–19

References

External links
PrvaLiga profile 

1987 births
Living people
People from Bosanska Krupa
Association football forwards
Bosnia and Herzegovina footballers
NK Zvijezda Gradačac players
FK Rudar Prijedor players
NK Travnik players
ND Mura 05 players
NK Maribor players
FC Dinamo Minsk players
NK Vitez players
Xinjiang Tianshan Leopard F.C. players
CS Universitatea Craiova players
FK Krupa players
FK Velež Mostar players
NK Jedinstvo Bihać players
NK Bjelovar players
First League of the Federation of Bosnia and Herzegovina players
First League of the Republika Srpska players
Slovenian PrvaLiga players
Belarusian Premier League players
China League One players
Liga I players
Premier League of Bosnia and Herzegovina players
Bosnia and Herzegovina expatriate footballers
Expatriate footballers in Slovenia
Bosnia and Herzegovina expatriate sportspeople in Slovenia
Expatriate footballers in Belarus
Bosnia and Herzegovina expatriate sportspeople in Belarus
Expatriate footballers in China
Bosnia and Herzegovina expatriate sportspeople in China
Expatriate footballers in Romania
Bosnia and Herzegovina expatriate sportspeople in Romania
Expatriate footballers in Croatia